Twelve Spanish dog breeds are recognised by both the Fédération Cynologique Internationale and by the Real Sociedad Canina de España, and a further twelve by the Real Sociedad alone. The society also lists nine breeds that have regional recognition from one of the Autonomous Communities of Spain and three , which the society defines as a regional dog population with consistent form and function evolved through functional selection. Other breeds are seeking, or are in the process of obtaining, recognition.

References

Dog breeds
Dog